Maren Fromm (née Brinker; born 10 July 1986) is a retired German volleyball player, a member of Germany women's national volleyball team.

Personal life
On 24 June 2017 she married Christian Fromm, German national team volleyball player.

Career
Brinker represented her country in the FIVB World Grand Prix 2009. She signed for the Italian club Unendo Yamamay Busto Arsizio in June 2012 and won the 2012 Italian Supercup with this club.

In the 2012–13 CEV Women's Champions League Brinker won the bronze medal with her club after falling to Rabita Baku in the semifinals, but defeating Galatasaray Daikin to claim the podium finish. She also won the Best Server award of the tournament.

2014 in the FIVB Championships in Italy, she carried the German team into the second round where they fell one point short of reaching the quarter finals (final 9th place).

After 11 years in the national team, she announced her retirement in the 2018 FIVB Women's World Championship

Clubs

Awards

Individuals
 2012–13 CEV Champions League "Best Server"
 2015 German Volleyball Player of the Year
 2016 German Volleyball Player of the Year

Clubs
 2012 Italian Supercup –  Champion, with Unendo Yamamay Busto Arsizio
 2012–13 CEV Champions League –  Bronze medal, with Unendo Busto

References

External links 
 

1986 births
Living people
German expatriate sportspeople in Turkey
German women's volleyball players
People from Wilhelmshaven
European Games competitors for Germany
Volleyball players at the 2015 European Games
Sportspeople from Lower Saxony